Void is the debut studio album by American progressive metal band Intronaut. It was released on August 23, 2006 in the United States through Goodfellow Records.

Track listing

Credits

Band members
 Sacha Dunable − guitar, vocals
 Leon del Muerte − guitar, vocals
 Joe Lester − bass
 Danny Walker − drums, samples

Other
 Recorded and mixed by John Haddad at the Trench Studios
 Logo, illustrations and layout by Justin Bartlett

References

Intronaut albums
2006 debut albums